Chad competed at the Summer Olympic Games for the first time at the 1964 Summer Olympics in Tokyo, Japan. It was invited by the Olympic Committee on May 1, that gave provisional recognition to the National Olympic Committee of Chad. The Chadian team arrived on June 19.

Athletics

Key
Note–Ranks given for track events are within the athlete's heat only
Q = Qualified for the next round
q = Qualified for the next round as a fastest loser or, in field events, by position without achieving the qualifying target
NR = National record
N/A = Round not applicable for the event
Bye = Athlete not required to compete in round

Men
Track

Field events

References
Official Olympic Reports

Nations at the 1964 Summer Olympics
1964
1964 in Chad